Banco de Sabadell, S.A. is a Spanish multinational financial services company headquartered in Alicante and Barcelona, Spain. It is the 4th-largest Spanish banking group. It includes several banks, brands, subsidiaries and associated banks. It is a universal bank and specialises in serving small and medium enterprises (SMEs) and the affluent with a bias towards international trade.

As of March 2022, the total assets of Banco Sabadell Group amounted to €253,256 billion. It has a network of 1,594 branches, 18,985 employees and 12.1 million customers.

Since 2001, it is floated on the Bolsa de Madrid and is part of the IBEX 35.

Strategic plan
In February 2014, Banco Sabadell started its 2014–2016 business plan, Triple, that aims to leverage its new size and margin-generating capability. The main goal of the 2014–2016 Triple Plan is profitability. Key themes of the new plan are transformation (transformation of the business, transformation of the production process and transformation of the balance sheet) and internationalization (laying the foundations for becoming more international in terms of structure and resources and entering new markets).

History

On 31 December 1881, a group of 127 businessmen and traders from Sabadell, in the province of Barcelona, founded the Bank with the purpose of financing local industries and providing them with raw materials (wool and coal) under more favourable conditions.

In 1907, Banco Sabadell began a new stage: it ended its non-banking businesses to focus on commercial banking. In 1953, in order to preserve the organisation's independence, the shareholders created a share syndication agreement.

In 1965, Banco Sabadell slowly spread to nearby towns. In 1975, it expanded beyond Catalonia, opening a branch in Madrid. In 1978, Banco Sabadell expanded internationally, initially in the City of London.

The bank is a pioneer in bank computing in Spain. In 1968, it automated accounting and administrative processes. In 1986, it introduced remote banking: the telephone (FonoBanc) and computer (InfoBanc) were incorporated as new channels for communication and service prodivision. In 1998, it launched BancSabadell Net, Spain's first Internet banking service.

In 1988, Sabadell MultiBanca, later Sabadell Banca Privada, opened, specialising in equity management and private banking and the Banco Sabadell group was formed.

In 1996, Banco Sabadell started a new expansion phase, increasing its size and operating capacity.

Banco Sabadell went public in 2001 and became a member of the IBEX 35 in 2004.

Since 2007, the Bank has doubled in size and is currently Spain's fifth largest bank. Acquisitions include NatWest Spain, Banco Herrero, Banco Atlántico, Banco Urquijo, TransAtlantic Bank, Private Banking Business of BBVA (US), Mellon United National Bank, Banco Guipuzcoano, Lydian Private Bank, Banco CAM, Banco Mare Nostrum (BMN) network in Catalonia and Aragon, Lloyds TSB Spain, Banco Gallego, Lloyds TSB Miami and JGB Bank.

On 5 October 2017, the board of Banco Sabadell decided in an emergency session to move their legal base to Alicante in response to growing political insecurity in Catalonia. A few days later, the bank decided to move its fiscal domicile to Alicante too.

In December 2018, it was announced the selling of 80% of Solvia to Intrum.

Timeline
1881: Founded in Sabadell, province of Barcelona, on 31 December 1881.
1965: Territorial expansion.
1978: London, first branch of the international network.
1986: Remote banking.
1987: International branch in Paris.
1988: Created Sabadell Banca Privada.
1996: Acquired Banco NatWest España: Solbank project.
2000: Acquired Banco Herrero.
2001: Floated on the stock market.
2002–2004: Introduced multi-brand strategy.
2004: Acquired Banco Atlántico.
2004: Included in IBEX 35.
2006: Acquired Banco Urquijo.
2007: Acquired TransAtlantic Bank, Miami.
2008: Zurich, new Bancassurance partner.
2009: Acquired Mellon United National Bank (Miami).
2010: Founded Sabadell United Bank.
2010: Acquired Banco Guipuzcoano.
2010: New plan CREA 2010–2013.
2011: Launched SabadellGuipuzcoano brand.
2011: Acquired Lydian Private Bank (Miami).
2011: Selected as winning bidder for Caja de Ahorros del Mediterráneo (CAM).
2012: Acquired Caja de Ahorros del Mediterráneo (CAM).
2012: Banco Sabadell Urquijo BP creation. 
2013: Acquired Banco Gallego and Lloyds Banking Group's retail and private banking business and the local investment management business in Spain, Lloyds Bank International. Lloyds is selling its loss-making Spanish operations for a 1.8% stake in Sabadell, worth about €84 million, plus an additional sum of up to €20 million euros over the next five years.
2014: Acquired JGB Bank (Miami).
2014: Banco Sabadell starts independent operation in Mexico.
2014: Triple announced.
2015: Acquired TSB, a retail bank based in the United Kingdom.

Brands
SabadellAtlántico: The group's primary brand in the Spanish market. It operates throughout Spain except in SabadellGuipuzcoano and Banco Herrero territories. It focuses on commercial banking for individuals and companies. 
SabadellGuipuzcoano: Formerly Banco Guipuzcoano. It is the group's brand in Navarre, La Rioja and the Basque Country.  It focuses on commercial and corporate banking. 
Banco Herrero: The bank's only brand in Asturias and León. following the acquisition of Banco Herrero.  It focuses on commercial banking for individuals and companies. It is the top banking network in Asturias and one of the leading networks in León.
Sabadell Solbank:  It focuses on commercial Banking for Europeans living in Spanish tourist areas. Branches in Mediterranean coastal areas and Spanish Islands. Lloyds Bank International was its trading name, owned by Banco Sabadell. The bank was established as Banco Halifax in 1993, as the Spanish subsidiary of Halifax. Banco Halifax became part of Lloyds Banking Group in 2009 and was renamed Lloyds Bank International. Lloyds Banking Group sold it in April 2013. The Lloyds Bank name was used under temporary licence. The bank was renamed Sabadell Solbank in November 2013, and was fully integrated into Sabadell on 15 March 2014.
ActivoBank:  It focuses on clients operating exclusively electronically (internet and telephone).
SabadellUrquijo: Private banking unit, a merger of Sabadell Banca Privada and Banco Urquijo. Branches in main economic and wealth hotspots.
SabadellGallego: It is the group's reference brand in Galicia, following the acquisition of Banco Gallego.  It focuses on commercial and corporate banking. 
SabadellCAM: It is the group's reference brand in the Valencian Community and Murcia, following the Banco CAM acquisition.  It focuses on commercial banking.

Subsidiaries
Banco Sabadell de Andorra: It is an entity established in the Principality of Andorra. Banco Sabadell has an ownership of 50.97% of the bank's capital. It focuses on affluent individuals and to the main companies in the Principality of Andorra. 
BanSabadell Fincom:  It focuses on consumer finance. 100% owned by Banco Sabadell.
Dexia Sabadell: Subsidiary specialising in funding local government. Banco Sabadell (30%) and Dexia Group (70%).
Sabadell United Bank: Commercial banking brand in the United States. Resulted from the acquisition of Mellon United National Bank in south Florida (15 January 2010) and the integration of TransAtlantic Bank (9 August 2010), acquired in 2007, Lydian Private Bank (2011) and JGB Bank (2014). SUB branches were sold off to Iberiabank in the fall of 2017.
Solvia:  It focuses on real estate. It has concentrated its servicing capabilities.
TSB Bank: Retail bank based in the United Kingdom. Acquired by Banco Sabadell in July 2015.

Branch network
At the end of the year 2014, Banco Sabadell operated through 2,310 branches and had 17,529 employees.

Banco Sabadell 53 international branches and representative offices in Algiers, Peking, Caracas, Dubai, Istanbul, México DF, New York, New Delhi, Santo Domingo, São Paulo, Shanghai, Singapore and Warsaw.

Banco Sabadell has subsidiaries and associated Banks in Andorra, United States, Portugal, United Kingdom; and branches in London, Miami, Paris, Hendaye and Casablanca.

Board of directors
The members of the Board of Directors of Banco Sabadell are:

Secretary to the Board Miquel Roca i Junyent. Deputy Secretary María José García Beato.*To be ratified at the next shareholders' meeting .

Shareholder structure

See also

 List of banks in Spain

References

External links

 
1881 establishments in Spain
Banks established in 1881
Banks of Spain
Companies listed on the Madrid Stock Exchange
IBEX 35
Sabadell
Banks under direct supervision of the European Central Bank